Cercyonis sthenele, the Great Basin wood-nymph, is a North American butterfly in the family Nymphalidae.

Description 
It is dark brown with two eyespots on the forewing with the upper larger than the lower.

The wingspan measures . Its flight period is from late June to late August. It is found in arid woodland, especially pinyon-juniper, chaparral and brushland habitats.

Subspecies 
The following subspecies are recognised:
C. s. behrii (F. Grinnell, 1905)
C. s. hypoleuca Hawks and J. Emmel, 1998
C. s. masoni Cross, 1937
C. s. paulus (Edwards, 1879)
C. s. silvestris Edwards, 1861
C. s. sineocellata Austin and J. Emmel in T. Emmel, 1998
C. s. sthenele (Boisduval, 1852) - nominate subspecies endemic to San Francisco Peninsula, now extinct

Similar species 
 Common wood-nymph (Cercyonis pegala) – larger, eyespots similar in size
 Small wood-nymph (Cercyonis oetus) – lacks lower eyespot in males, lower eyespot is closer to margin than upper eyespot in females

Range and distribution 
Ranges over much of the western United States and reaches to southern British Columbia, Canada.

Larval host plants 
Larvae feed on various species of grass. The first instar hibernates.

References

Cercyonis
Butterflies described in 1852